Callawadda is a locality in the Wimmera region of western Victoria, Australia.

References

External links

Towns in Victoria (Australia)
Wimmera